Calcageria is a genus of bristle flies in the family Tachinidae.

Species
Calcageria incidens Curran, 1927
Calcageria varians Malloch, 1938

References

Taxa named by Charles Howard Curran
Insects of New Zealand
Diptera of Australasia
Dexiinae
Tachinidae genera